The Archeparchy of Changanacherry is a Syro-Malabar Catholic archeparchy with an area of 24,595 km2 comprising the districts of Kottayam, Alappuzha, Pathanamthitta, Kollam, and Thiruvananthapuram in Kerala, and also Kanyakumari district in Tamil Nadu. It is one of the largest Catholic dioceses in India in terms of area. Joseph Perumthottam is the current Metropolitan Archbishop, serving since 2007. Thomas Tharayil has been the auxiliary bishop since 2017. And Joseph Powathil is the bishop emeritus, having served from 1985 to 2007. Suffragan eparchies of the Changanassery archeparchy includes Palai, Kanjirappally-Nilackal, and Thuckalay-Thiruvithancode (Tamil Nadu).

The Changanacherry (originally named Kottayam) jurisdiction was one of the first two Syro-Malabar vicariates, along with Syro-Malabar Catholic Archeparchy of Thrissur, when Pope Leo XIII in 1887 re-organized Syro-Malabar Catholics as a separate church from the Latin Church's jurisdiction ever since the Synod of Diamper in 1599.

History
The Apostolic Church of St. Thomas Christians traditionally traces its origin to St. Thomas, the Apostle, who is held to have arrived on the Kerala Coast in A.D. 52. In the course of history this Church entered into good relationship with the East Syriac Church. The presbiteral office of the Archdeacon of all India did the temporal administration.
 
The Portuguese missionaries who arrived in the 15th century could not decipher the liturgical traditions and the mode of governance of this Church. They Latinized the ancient liturgical texts and forced existing East Syriac Christians or Nasranis to convert to the Roman Catholic Church under the Padroado Archbishop of Goa. When the domination of the Portuguese missionaries became unbearable, a section of this community broke away from western supremacy in 1653 and accepted allegiance to Antiochian West Syriac Rite and Miaphysite belief. But a good number returned to the East Syriac Catholic fold through unification efforts. Those who did not return constitute the present Malankara Churches. The others maintained and regained loyalty to the Apostolic See of Rome. This relationship started only in 1553 as a half Catholic-half Nestorian position due to a split in the Babylonian Church of the East and strengthened in 1599 through the Udayamperur sunnahadose (Synod of Diamper).
 
The first two Vicariates of the Syro-Malabar Church are Trichur and Kottayam. The Archdiocese of Changanacherry is part of the Kottayam Vicariate and the second Metropolitan Archdiocese of the Syro-Malabar Church, after the establishment of the Syro-Malabar hierarchy which was the prelude to the restoration of the identity of the Church in 1992 as a Sui Iuris Church. Pope Leo XIII of happy memory by his Bull ‘Quod Iam Pridem’ dated 20 May 1887 established two Vicariates Apostolic - Kottayam and Thrissur; exclusively for the Syro-Malabarians. Dr. Charles Lavigne for Kottayam and Dr. Adolph Medlycott for Trichur respectively were appointed the Vicars Apostolic.
 
The same Pope reorganised the existing Vicariates by the Bull ‘Quae Rei Sacrae’ dated 28 July 1896 establishing a new Vicariate, Ernakulam, with territories carved out from the two existing Vicariates (1) Pallippuram, Alappuzha, 2) Edappally and 3) Arakuzha divisions from Kottayam Vicariate). Indigenous bishops were appointed Vicars Apostolic in the new Sees. They included Mar Mathew Makil for Changanacherry, Mar Louis Pazheparambil (from Changanacherry Vicariate) for Ernakulam and Mar John Menacherry (from Ernakulam Vicariate) for Thrissur.
 
A new Vicariate of Kottayam was constituted in 1911 exclusively for the Southists and Mar Mathew Makil was transferred to Kottayam as the Vicar Apostolic of Southists and Mar Thomas Kurialacherry was appointed the Vicar Apostolic of Changanacherry. With the establishment of the Syro-Malabar Hierarchy on 21 December 1923 by the Bull ‘Romani Pontifices’ of Pope Pius XI, the Diocese of Thrissur, Changanacherry and Kottayam became suffragans of the Archdiocese of Ernakulam thereby constituting the first Modern Syro-Malabar Province.
 
On 25 July 1950 the Diocese of Changanacherry was bifurcated by the Bull ‘Quo Ecclesiarum’ of Pope Pius XII and the new Diocese of Palai was created. The Holy See being impressed by the wonderful progress achieved by the Syro-Malabarians, extended the hitherto held boundaries of Changanacherry to the areas south of river Pamba, up to (including) Kanyakumari, by the Bull ‘Multorum Fidelium’ of Pope Pius XII, dated 29 April 1955. Changanacherry was raised to the status of an archdiocese on 26 July 1956 by Pope Pius XII constituting the second province in the Syro-Malabar Church and Kottayam and Pala became its suffragans. The Apostolic Constitution ‘Regnum Caelorum’ of 26 November 1959 of Pope John XXIII gave effect to this decision of Pope Pius XII.
 
In 1975 the missionary work of three (now five) civil districts of the Archdiocese of Agra in the State of Uttar Pradesh was taken up completely by the Archeparchy of Changanacherry. The Archdiocese was again divided on 26 February 1977 by the Bull ‘Nos Beati Petri’ of Pope Paul VI and the new Eparchy of Kanjirappilly was set up comprising parts of the Civil districts of Kottayam and Idukki. The Archeparchy was divided a fourth time when its Kanyakumari Mission was elevated to the status of a new diocese by the Bull Apud Indorum Gentes of John Paul II, dated 18 December 1996. The formal inauguration of the new eparchy of Thuckalay and the Episcopal consecration of Mar George Alencherry as its first Bishop took place on 2 February 1997.
 
The Archeparchy of Changanacherry now comprises the civil districts of Thiruvananthapuram, Kollam, Pathanamthitta, Alappuzha and Kottayam in Kerala and Palai, Kanjirapally and Thuckalay as its suffragans. Archbishop Mar Joseph Powathil assumed the office of the Archbishop of Changanacherry on 17 January 1986 and resigned in 2007. Mar Joseph Perumthottam was appointed on 20 January 2007 as the new Metropolitan Archbishop of Changanacherry and was installed on 19 March 2007.

Eparchs and archeparchs

Suffragan eparchies
Syro-Malabar Catholic Eparchy of Palai
Syro-Malabar Catholic Eparchy of Kanjirappally
Syro-Malabar Catholic Eparchy of Thuckalay

Institutions and personnel
The total number of parishes is nearly 300. In addition,. The population of Syro-Malabar Catholics in Changanacherry Archdiocese is  nearly about 400000. There are 18 foranes under Changanacherry Archdiocese.

Parishes and population
Foranes under Archdiocese of Changanacherry include, 
Alappuzha, Kollam-Ayur, Manimala, Kottayam, Thiruvananthapuram, Kurumpanadom, Edathua, Amboori, Nedumkunnam, Athirampuzha, Kudamaloor, Pulincunnu, Champakulam, Changanacherry,Thrickodithanam, Thuruthy, Muhamma,  Chengannur
.

Important events 
 19 February 1892: Foundation Stone laid for the new Bishop's House at Vedikkunnu.
 21 March 1891: Bishop Lavigne shifts his residence to Changanacherry (Mount Carmel CMC Convent).
 3 February 1891: St. Berchmans, the first highschool of the Syrians founded on the precincts of St. Mary's Cathedral Changanacherry.
 1 October 1890: Letter of Permission to shift the headquarters of Kottayam, Vicariate to Changanacherry
 18 December 1888: Bishop Charles Lavigne convenes Changanacherry Synod.
 14 December 1888: Bishop Lavigne established St. Germane's, the first Orphanage and FCC.
 10 May 1888: Bishop Charles assumes charge
 13 September 1887: Bishop Charles Lavigne, Vicar Apostolic of Kottayam.
 20 May 1887: Establishment of Vicariates of Kottayam and Trissur.
 15 April 1887: Nazarani Deepika launched.
 16 January 1887: Reconstruction of the present Metropolitan Church.
 28 July 1896: Vicariate of Ernakulam created, with territories from both Vicariates.
 21 December 1923: Establishment of Syro Malabar Hierarchy with Ernakulam as the Metropolitan See
 29 July 1956: The diocese of Changanassery made Metropolitan See
 3 July 1962: Establishment of St. Thomas Apostolic Seminary, Vadavathoor, Kottayam.
 3 December 1972: Establishment of archdiocese youth movement, YUVADEEPTI-KCYM
 15 January 2003: Diocese of Idukki established.
15-August-2019 :Honorary Doctorate for Archbishop Emirates Mar Joseph Powathil

First vicar general

1889-1892 Msgr Nidhiry Mani Kathanar

Saints and causes for canonisation
 St Alphonsa
St. Kuriakose Elias Chavara
 Ven. Thomas Kurialacherry
 Servant of God Thommachan Puthenparampil
 Servant of God Mar Mathew Kavukattu
 Philomena Vallayil (Mary Francesca de Chantal)
 Benedict Onamkulam

References

External links

Website of the Archdiocese
Archdiocese of Changanassery: Information & Photographs
GCatholic.org
Catholic-hierarchy.org
Catholic Bishop Conference of India (CBCI)

 
Changanassery
Religious organizations established in 1896
Syro-Malabar Catholic dioceses
Eastern Catholic dioceses in India
Roman Catholic dioceses and prelatures established in the 19th century
Dioceses in Kerala
Churches in Kottayam district